One Long String is an album by American jazz bassist Red Mitchell's Trio featuring Swedish pianist Bobo Stenson and drummer Rune Carlsson recorded in Paris in 1969 and first released on the Mercury label.

Reception
The Allmusic review by Jason Ankeny states "The album percolates with energy and daring, with an underlying soulfulness ...For all the mechanics at work throughout One Long String, the end result is a record that never loses focus or its sense of collaborative spirit".

Track listing
All compositions by Red Mitchell except as indicated
 "One Long String" - 5:53
 "Peggy" - 5:16
 "Narbild" (F.  Sjöström) - 7:19
 "Undertow" - 4:10
 "Total Tumult" - 4:56
 "Stella by Starlight" (Ned Washington, Victor Young) - 6:46
 "Pojken I Grottan" (Bobo Stenson) - 4:59
 "When I Have You" - 8:48

Personnel
Red Mitchell - bass
Bobo Stenson - piano
Rune Carlsson - drums

References

Mercury Records albums
Red Mitchell albums
1969 albums
Sunnyside Records albums